Project Fame, also known as Project Fame West Africa or MTN Project Fame West Africa (for sponsorship purposes), is a music talent TV reality show filmed in Lagos and aired in the West African subcontinent. It is a regional version of Star Academy reality series that was developed and is licensed worldwide by Endemol. The show used to feature contestants from Ghana, Liberia, Nigeria and Sierra Leone, but Liberia and Sierra Leone have been dropped since the 2014 Ebola Outbreak. The show is broadcast by networks in these four countries and across the African continent.

Run by Ultima production, Project Fames inaugural season began in 2008. The production format consists of gala evenings held each Sunday night in prime time and hosted by Joseph Benjamin and Adaora Oleh. In season 7, Adaora was replaced with Bolanle Olukanni. Additionally, there's a weekly recap show and the Eviction night on Saturday night.

The jury is formed by three judges; Praiz, Bibie Brew and Tee-Y Mix, and Faculty members of the Academy which include: Joke Silva, Lovette Otegbola, Dupe Ige and Ben Ogbeiwi.

The show is notorious for its winners struggling to make a name for themselves in the industry after they win. Of all the contestants in the 9 seasons, only Iyanya, Chidinma, Praiz, Niniola and Johnny Drille have gone on to make various degrees of success in music; season 5 winner Ayoola went on to become a thriving TV star

Winners & Runners-up

Season 1 (2008)

Season 2 (2009)

Season 3 (2010)

Gala evenings
1st Live Show - Contestant's choice

2nd Live Show - Aṣa & Tracy ChapmanMentor: Aṣa

3rd Live Show - ReggaeMentor: Samini

4th Live Show - African NightMentor: Lagbaja

5th Live Show - Soft Rock and SoulMentor: Frank Edoho

6th Live Show - Classic Duets & Evergreen Disco SongsMentor: Yinka Davies

7th Live Show -  Afro-Caribbean nightMentor': Onyeka Onwenu

Elimination chart

 The contestant won the show
 The contestant lost in the final
 The contestant was in the Bottom Five, but saved by the jury
 The contestant was in the Bottom Five, but saved by the academy
 The contestant was in the Bottom Five, but saved by the students
 The contestant was eliminated

Season 4 (2011)

Season 5 (2012)

Season 6 (2013)

Season 7 (2014)

Season 8 (2015)

Season 8 is being broadcast on TVC, MITV, DBN, SOUNDCITY, ONTV and GETTV. the finalists are Ada, Anderson, Arewa, Deinde, Jeff & pearl.
  Jeffrey oji finished as the winner of season 8

Season 9 (2016)

References

External links
Official website

Twitter

Nigerian reality television series
Music competitions in Nigeria
Africa Independent Television original programming
Nigerian Television Authority original programming
ONTV Nigeria original programming